Tarybų Lietuvos enciklopedija or TLE (translation: Encyclopedia of Soviet Lithuania) was an encyclopedia of the Lithuanian SSR, covering topics such as archaeology, history, nature, science, cultural heritage, cities, districts, biographies of famous people and politics, but only as they relate to Lithuania. It was published in four volumes between 1985 and 1988 in Vilnius. It was derived from the 12-volume Lietuviškoji tarybinė enciklopedija but TLE did not cover general areas such as technology, biology, pharmacology, chemistry, medicine, mathematics and others.

Volumes
 Volume 1: A–Grūdas, 1985
 Volume 2: Grūdas–Marvelis, 1986
 Volume 3: Masaitis–Simno, 1987
 Volume 4: Simno–Žvorūnė, 1988

References

Soviet encyclopedias
Lithuanian encyclopedias
1985 non-fiction books
20th-century encyclopedias